The second K Karunakaran ministry (28 December 1981 – 17 March 1982 ) was a short-lived coalition government in the state of Kerala led by Congress Leader K. Karunakaran. Karunakaran resigned after 81 days in office, when a member of Kerala Congress (M) withdrew his support for the ministry.

Ministers 
The table below shows the list of ministers of the Second K. Karunakaran Ministry.

See also 
 Chief Ministers of Kerala
 Kerala Ministers

References

Karunakaran 02
Indian National Congress state ministries
Indian National Congress of Kerala
1981 establishments in Kerala
1982 disestablishments in India
Cabinets established in 1981
Cabinets disestablished in 1982